The Governor of Entre Ríos is a citizen of the Entre Ríos Province, in Argentina, holding the office of governor for the corresponding period. The governor is elected alongside a vice-governor. Currently the governor of Entre Ríos is Gustavo Bordet.

Governors since 1983

See also
 Legislature of Entre Ríos
 Senate of Entre Ríos
 Chamber of Deputies of Entre Ríos

References

Entre Ríos Province
Entre Ríos Province